Heather Fischer (born November 28, 1988) is an American racing cyclist, who currently rides for French amateur team Féminin Le Boulou.

Major results

2015
 5th Acht van Westerveld
 9th Grand Prix cycliste de Gatineau
2016
 Tour of the Gila
1st  Sprints classification
1st Stage 4
 4th Winston-Salem Cycling Classic
 6th Philadelphia Cycling Classic
 10th Overall Joe Martin Stage Race

See also
 List of 2016 UCI Women's Teams and riders

References

External links
 
 

1988 births
Living people
American female cyclists
Place of birth missing (living people)
21st-century American women
University of Colorado Boulder alumni